Janowiec (Janowiec nad Wisłą) is a village in Lublin Voivodeship (east Poland).

Janowiec may also refer to:

Janowiec, Lower Silesian Voivodeship (south-west Poland)
Janowiec, Łódź Voivodeship (central Poland)
Janowiec, Subcarpathian Voivodeship (south-east Poland)
Janowiec, Zielona Góra County in Lubusz Voivodeship (west Poland)
Janowiec, Pomeranian Voivodeship (north Poland)
Janowiec, Warmian-Masurian Voivodeship (north Poland)
Janówiec, West Pomeranian Voivodeship (north-west Poland)

See also
Janovice
Janowitz
Janowice (disambiguation)